The Barnburners and Hunkers were the names of two opposing factions of the New York Democratic Party in the mid-19th century. The main issue dividing the two factions was that of slavery, with the Barnburners being the anti-slavery faction. While this division occurred within the context of New York politics, it reflected the national divisions in the United States in the years preceding the American Civil War.

Barnburners

The Barnburners were the radical faction. The term barnburner was derived from the idea of someone who would burn down his own barn to get rid of a rat infestation. In this case it was applied to men who were thought to be willing to destroy all banks and corporations, in order to root out their abuses.

The Barnburners opposed expanding the public debt, and were opposed to the power of large state-established corporations. They also generally came to oppose the extension of slavery. They also stood for local control by the Albany Regency, as against the Polk political machine which the new administration was trying to build up in New York. Among the prominent Barnburners were Martin Van Buren, Silas Wright and John A. Dix.

At the 1848 presidential election, the Barnburners left the Democratic Party, refusing to support presidential nominee Lewis Cass. They joined with other anti-slavery groups, predominantly the abolitionist Liberty Party and some anti-slavery Conscience Whigs from New England and the Midwest, to form the Free Soil Party. This group nominated former President Van Buren to run again for the presidency. Their vote divided Democratic strength. Zachary Taylor, the Whig nominee, was elected to office.

After the Compromise of 1850 temporarily neutralized the issue of slavery and undercut the party's no-compromise position, most Barnburners who had joined the Free Soil Party returned to the Democrats. In 1854, some Barnburners helped to form the Republican Party.

Hunkers

The Hunkers were the relatively pro-government faction. They opposed the Barnburners, and favored state banks, internal improvements, and minimizing the slavery issue. The Hunkers were so named because they were "hankering" for Federal office. Among the leaders of the Hunkers were Horatio Seymour, William L. Marcy, Samuel Beardsley, Edwin Croswell, and Daniel S. Dickinson.

Following the 1848 election, the Hunkers themselves split over the question of reconciliation with the Barnburners, with the Softs, led by Marcy, favoring reconciliation, and the Hards, led by Dickinson, opposing it. This split would be exacerbated following the 1852 presidential election, when disputes over patronage led to an even broader split between Hards and Softs and helped lead to the defeat of the Soft governor, Horatio Seymour, running for re-election in 1854.

Notes

References 
 
 
 
 

Democratic Party (United States) organizations
Factions in the Democratic Party (United States)
Political history of New York (state)